Pamplona is the capital city of Navarre in Spain.

Pamplona may also refer to:
Places:
Kingdom of Pamplona (later called Kingdom of Navarre), a medieval kingdom
Pamplona, Norte de Santander, in Colombia
Pamplona, a neighbourhood in Guatemala City, Guatemala
In the Philippines:
Pamplona, Cagayan
Pamplona, Camarines Sur
Pamplona, Negros Oriental
Pamplona, a barrio in Las Piñas

Other:
Pamplona (meat), a stuffed and rolled grilled meat dish from Uruguay
Pamplona (footballer) (1904-1973), Brazilian footballer